Roufusport (also known as Roufusport MMA Academy) is a mixed martial arts gym based in Milwaukee, Wisconsin. Known as one of the top gyms in MMA, it has produced two former UFC champions, Anthony Pettis (former UFC Lightweight Champion) and Tyron Woodley (former UFC Welterweight Champion).

Background 
Duke Roufus is a former professional kickboxer who retired in 2002. In 1993 he founded Roufusport in his dad's Milwaukee based martial arts school’s basement.

In the years since, Roufusport has managed to persevere, grow and emerge as one of the top MMA gyms in the world that has trained many high level fighters. Two of its fighters have gone onto to win UFC champions while training with Roufusport. They are Anthony Pettis and Tyron Woodley.

Controversy over the death of Dennis Munson Jr. 
On 28 March 2014, Dennis Munson Jr., an amateur kickboxer from Roufus' gym, Roufusport, died after taking part in a bout promoted by Roufus. The bout took place in Milwaukee, Wisconsin, where the fighters were not required to wear protective headgear. Munson's recorded cause of death by the Milwaukee County medical examiner was head trauma. Dehydration caused by the fighter cutting weight up to and including the day of the fight, was considered a potential contributing factor.

Munson's two cornermen were his coaches from the Roufusport gym, and as the event promoter, Roufus appointed the ringside doctor, referee and other officials. It was Munson's first fight.

Video footage of the bout circulated widely. It was noted despite Munson showing signs of having difficulty returning to his corner, the staff including the doctor did not engage in administrating medical assistance until it was too late when Munson collapse in the ring. Munsun arrived at the hospital  where he died a few hours later. After Munson's death, Roufus was publicly criticized by experts in the sport for his promotional practices, and the decisions and actions of the officials and Munson's cornermen at the bout. He was further criticized by several past students and past Roufousport staff for his treatment of students, behavior and management style at Roufusport gym.

In 2017, the family of Dennis Munson Jr filed a lawsuit against Roufusport and several staff that were part of the bout. It alleged those responsible for Munson's safety failed in their duty to protect him during the unregulated bout. The lawsuit was fully settled with all parties in 2020.

Notable fighters 

 Anthony Pettis
 Tyron Woodley
 Rose Namajunas
 Jens Pulver
 Ben Askren
 Sergio Pettis
 Pat Barry
 Dustin Ortiz
 Ben Rothwell
 Alan Belcher
 Matt Mitrione
 Pascal Krauss
 Sage Northcutt
 Paul Felder
 Belal Muhammad
 Erik Koch
 CM Punk
 Emmanuel Sanchez
 Gerald Meerschaert
 Mike Rhodes
 Sarah Kaufman
 Ryan Janes
 John Makdessi
 Jared Gordon
 Jordan Griffin
 Maycee Barber
 Brendan Allen

See also
List of Top Professional MMA Training Camps

References

External links 
 Official Website

Mixed martial arts training facilities
Buildings and structures in Milwaukee
2006 establishments in Wisconsin